Datuk Linda Tsen Thau Lin is a Malaysian politician. She is the former Member of the Parliament of Malaysia for the Batu Sapi constituency in Sandakan, Sabah, representing the United Sabah Party (PBS) in the former ruling Barisan Nasional (BN) coalition.

Background
Tsen, born in Sandakan in 1956, attended her early education at Chi Hwa Primary School and Tiong Hwa Secondary School in Sandakan. She later further her study at St. Brandon School, United Kingdom; Trinity College of Music, London and Fellowship London College of Music. She is a musician and piano teacher, and has held the position of president of the Kota Kinabalu Music Society.

Political career
Tsen was elected to federal Parliament in the Batu Sapi by-election on 4 November 2010 after the seat had been vacant upon the death of the incumbent who is Tsen's husband, Edmund Chong Ket Wah. She defeated candidates of the Sabah Progressive Party (SAPP) and the People's Justice Party (PKR). She successfully retained the seat in the 2013 general election but lost in the 2018 general election. In 2019, she contested again in the Sandakan by election, but was defeated by the Democratic Action Party (DAP) candidate Vivian Wong Shir Yee.

Tsen had previously served as the Women (Wanita) section head of PBS for Elopura division.

Election results 
{| class="wikitable" style="margin:0.5em ; font-size:95%"
|+ Parliament of Malaysia
!|Year
!|Constituency
!colspan=2|
!|Votes
!|Pct
!colspan=2|Opponent(s)
!|Votes
!|Pct
!|Ballots cast
!|Majority
!|Turnout
|-
| rowspan=2|2010
| rowspan=7|P185 Batu Sapi, Sabah
| rowspan=2  |
| rowspan=2|Linda Tsen Thau Lin (PBS)
| rowspan=2 align="right" |9,773
| rowspan=2|64.22%
| |
|Ansari Abdullah (PKR)
|align="right" |3,414
|22.43%
| rowspan=2|15,613
| rowspan=2|6,359
| rowspan=2|61.03%
|-
| |
|Yong Teck Lee (SAPP) 
|align="right" |2,031
|13.35%
|-
| rowspan=2|2013
| rowspan=2  |
| rowspan=2|Linda Tsen Thau Lin ([[United Sabah Party|PBS]])
| rowspan=2 align="right" |13,085| rowspan=2|57.44%| |
|Hamzah Abdullah (PAS)
|align="right" |9,287
|40.76%
| rowspan=2|23,400
| rowspan=2|3,798
| rowspan=2|77.49%
|-
| 
| Ahmad (STAR)
|align="right" |410
|1.80%
|-
| rowspan=3|2018
| rowspan=3  |
| rowspan=3|Linda Tsen Thau Lin (PBS)
| rowspan=3 align="right" |8,357
| rowspan=3|35.93%
| |
|Liew Vui Keong (WARISAN)
|align="right" |12,976|55.78%| rowspan=3|24,029
| rowspan=3|4,619
| rowspan=3|73.77%
|-
|bgcolor=""|
| (AMANAH)
|align="right" |980
|4.21%
|-
| |
|Norsah Bongsu (PAS)
|align="right" |948
|4.08%
|-
| rowspan="4" |2019
| rowspan="4" |P186 Sandakan, Sabah
| rowspan="4"  | 
| rowspan="4" |Linda Tsen Thau Lin (PBS)
| rowspan="4" align="right"  |4,491
| rowspan="4" |20.80%
| |
|Vivian Wong Shir Yee (DAP)
|16,012|74.15%| rowspan=4|40,131
| rowspan=4|11,521
| rowspan=4|54.44%
|-
| |
|Hamzah Abdullah  (IND)
|align="right" |788
|3.65%
|-
| |
|Chia Siew Yung  (IND)
|align="right" |178
|0.82%
|-
| |
|Sulaiman Abdul Samat  (IND)
|align="right" |126
|0.58%
|}

 Honours 
Honours of Malaysia
  :
  Commander of the Order of Kinabalu (PGDK) – Datuk''' (2013)

References 

Date of birth missing (living people)
Living people
1956 births
People from Sabah
Malaysian politicians of Chinese descent
Malaysian people of Hakka descent
Malaysian Christians
Malaysian musicians
United Sabah Party politicians
Members of the Dewan Rakyat
Women members of the Dewan Rakyat
Women in Sabah politics
Commanders of the Order of Kinabalu